Novostroy is a rural locality (a settlement) in Zamyansky Selsoviet of Yenotayevsky District, Astrakhan Oblast, Russia. The population was 406 as of 2010. There are 8 streets.

Geography 
Novostroy is located 240 km southeast of Yenotayevka (the district's administrative centre) by road. Pribrezhny is the nearest rural locality.

References 

Rural localities in Yenotayevsky District